Yves Nzabouamba (born 27 January 1974) is a Gabonese footballer. He played in five matches for the Gabon national football team from 1997 to 2000. He was also named in Gabon's squad for the 2000 African Cup of Nations tournament.

References

External links
 

1974 births
Living people
Gabonese footballers
Gabon international footballers
2000 African Cup of Nations players
Place of birth missing (living people)
Association footballers not categorized by position
21st-century Gabonese people